Red White and Blue may refer to:

Film
 Red White & Blue (film), a 2010 film by Simon Rumley
 The Three Colors trilogy or Red, White, and Blue, a film trilogy by Krzysztof Kieślowski
 Red, White and Blue (film), a 2020 Steve McQueen film from the Small Axe anthology series

Music
 Red, White & Blues, a 1992 album by The Blues Brothers
 "Red, White and Blue" (song), a 1976 song by Loretta Lynn
 "Red White & Blue" (Lynyrd Skynyrd song) (2003)
 "Columbia, Gem of the Ocean" or "The Red, White and Blue", an American patriotic song

Other uses
 Red, White and Blue (ship), a lifeboat that crossed the Atlantic in 1866
 Red White & Blue Beer, a brand of American beer
 Red-white-blue bag, a bag made out of colored canvas
 Flag of the United States, known by the nickname "the Red, White, and Blue"
 Flag of the Netherlands, known by the nickname "Rood-wit-blauw" (meaning Red, White, and Blue)
 Red, White and Blue (comics), characters in comics by All-American Publications
 Red White Blue, an artwork series by Stanley Wong

See also
 Bleu, blanc et rouge (disambiguation) , French for "blue, white and red"
 Flags that contain red, white, and blue
 Pan-Slavic colors